Live at Tramps, NYC, 1996 is a live album recorded by American hip hop group De La Soul on May 16, 1996, at New York City's Tramps nightclub and released in 2004.

During the performances, the group is joined by Jungle Brothers, Common, and Mos Def.

Track listing
Maseo Intro  – 0:42
Breakadawn  – 3:02
Supa Emcees  – 3:09
Potholes in My Lawn  – 2:37
Big Brother Beat  – 3:57
Guest appearance: Mos Def
Me Myself And I  – 2:19
Shwingalokate  – 1:48
Ego Trippin' (Part Two)  – 3:37
Oodles of O's  – 2:36
The Bitch in Yoo  – 1:37
Guest appearance: Common
The Bizness  – 4:21
Guest appearance: Common
Itzsoweezee (HOT)  – 2:15
Buddy  – 3:01
Guest appearance: Jungle Brothers
Stakes Is High  – 4:42
Goodbyes  – 0:49

References

De La Soul albums
2004 live albums
Rhino Entertainment live albums